1911–12 Ashes series may refer to:
Cricket's 1911–12 Ashes series which was contested by the English cricket team in Australia in 1911–12
Rugby league's 1911–12 Ashes series which was contested during the 1911–12 Kangaroo tour of Great Britain